Peter Thomas O'Brien (born 6 November 1935) is an Australian clergyman, missionary and New Testament scholar.  He has written commentaries on Ephesians, Philippians, Colossians, Philemon, and Hebrews as well as books and articles on aspects of the thought the apostle Paul.

Ministry

O'Brien was converted at the age of nineteen, and studied at Moore Theological College and the University of Manchester. He taught at Union Biblical Seminary in Yavatmal, India, before returning to Moore as a lecturer, later serving as Vice Principal. While teaching at Moore he was a Recognised Teacher in Divinity at the University of Sydney. He is a priest in the Anglican Diocese of Sydney.

In 2000, a Festschrift was published in his honour, called A Gospel for the Nations: Perspectives on Paul's Mission: Essays Presented to Peter Thomas O’Brien on his Sixty-Fifth Birthday. Contributors included Paul Barnett, Don Carson, William Dumbrell, Graeme Goldsworthy, Peter Jensen, Andreas Köstenberger, Richard Longenecker, I. Howard Marshall, Ralph P. Martin, Donald Robinson, Moisés Silva, David Wenham, and Bruce Winter. In 2002 he received an honorary doctorate from the Australian College of Theology.  In 2014 he received an honorary doctorate from Westminster Theological Seminary in Philadelphia.

Withdrawal of commentaries

In early July 2016, allegations of plagiarism were made against O'Brien in regards to his commentary The Letter to the Hebrews in the Pillar New Testament Commentary series. On 15 August 2016 Eerdmans announced that after internal and external review that "what [they] found on the pages of this commentary runs afoul of commonly accepted standards with regard to the utilization and documentation of secondary sources. [They] agreed that the book could not be retained in print." As a result, they were ceasing sales of the commentary, along with two other works from O'Brien. IVP issued a similar statement regarding two titles in their New Studies in Biblical Theology (NSBT) series. By 4 November 2016 a similar statement was issued by the publishers Zondervan regarding O'Brien's Colossians – Philemon volume in the Word Biblical Commentary series. Each statement contains expressions of regret and evidences considerable reluctance in taking these actions.

O'Brien stated, "In the New Testament commentaries that I have written, although I have never deliberately misused the work of others, nevertheless I now see that my work processes at times have been faulty and have generated clear-cut, but unintentional, plagiarism. For this I apologize without reservation."

Works

Books

Chapters

Articles

References

Living people
1935 births
Moore Theological College alumni
Alumni of the University of Manchester
New Testament scholars
Australian biblical scholars
Bible commentators
Academic staff of Moore Theological College
Australian Anglican priests
Anglican biblical scholars